Wattana Kadkhunthod is an international Thai lawn and indoor bowler.

Bowls career
Kadkhunthod won the gold medal at the 2018 Asian Lawn Bowls Championship in the singles. The previous year he had won a bronze medal as part of the Thai triples team in the Lawn bowls at the 2017 Southeast Asian Games.

In 2022, he qualified to represent Thailand at the 2022 World Bowls Indoor Championships. The event had been cancelled in 2020 and 2021 due to the COVID-19 pandemic.

References

Wattana Kadkhunthod
Living people
Wattana Kadkhunthod
Competitors at the 2017 Southeast Asian Games
Year of birth missing (living people)